Mentally Murdered is an EP by the English grindcore band Napalm Death, released in 1989. It was later included on the Harmony Corruption CD and the Death by Manipulation compilation album. On this EP the band's migration to death metal territory is more readily evident than on its previous album. It is the final studio recording with Bill Steer and Lee Dorrian, who simultaneously departed the band due to musical and personality differences.

Track listing

The song Mentally Murdered is a different recording than the version found on From Enslavement to Obliteration.

Credits
Lee Dorrian - vocals
Bill Steer - guitars
Shane Embury - bass
Mick Harris - drums

Charts

References

1989 EPs
Napalm Death EPs
Earache Records EPs